Jonathan Freeny (born June 15, 1989) is a former American football linebacker. He played college football at Rutgers. He has also been a member of the Miami Dolphins, Chicago Rush, Baltimore Ravens, Jacksonville Jaguars, New England Patriots, New Orleans Saints, and Detroit Lions.

College career
Freeny chose to accept a scholarship to Rutgers University due to then head coach Greg Schiano's connections to South Florida from his time with the University of Miami. Freeny would play 46 games at Rutgers and primarily played at defensive end and linebacker.

Professional career

Miami Dolphins
Freeny signed with the Miami Dolphins as an undrafted free agent on July 28, 2011. He was released by the team on September 3, 2011.

Chicago Rush
Freeny was assigned to the Chicago Rush on October 4, 2011. He was exempted by the Rush on December 6, 2011.

Miami Dolphins
Freeny was signed to the Dolphins' practice squad on December 7, 2011. He then spent the following 3 seasons on the Dolphins active roster. At the end of the 2014 season Freeny became a restricted free agent but was not tendered a contract by Miami and therefore became an unrestricted free agent.

New England Patriots
On March 12, 2015, Freeny signed with the New England Patriots on a one-year deal. On September 24, 2015, the Patriots extended Freeny's contract through 2016 after emerging as a core special teamer. He played in 13 regular season games with seven starts registering 43 tackles, one sack, one pass breakup, one forced fumble, two fumble recoveries and two special teams tackles.

On August 27, 2016, the Patriots signed Freeny to a two-year contract extension. He was placed on injured reserve on October 15, 2016 with a shoulder injury.

On February 5, 2017, Freeny's Patriots appeared in Super Bowl LI. In the game, the Patriots defeated the Atlanta Falcons by a score of 34–28 in overtime.

On September 2, 2017, Freeny was released by the Patriots.

Baltimore Ravens
On September 27, 2017, Freeny signed with the Baltimore Ravens. He was released on October 17, 2017.

Jacksonville Jaguars
On October 24, 2017, Freeny signed with the Jacksonville Jaguars, but was released four days later.

New England Patriots (second stint)
On December 6, 2017, Freeny was re-signed by the Patriots, but was released one week later.

New Orleans Saints
On December 14, 2017, Freeny was claimed off waivers by the New Orleans Saints.

Detroit Lions
On March 26, 2018, Freeny signed with the Detroit Lions, reuniting him with former defensive coordinator in New England, Matt Patricia. He was released on September 1, 2018.

Personal life
Freeny is distant cousins with Dwight Freeney.

References

External links
Rutgers bio
Miami Dolphins bio
New England Patriots bio

1989 births
Living people
American football linebackers
American football defensive ends
People from Margate, Florida
Players of American football from Florida
Rutgers Scarlet Knights football players
Sportspeople from the Miami metropolitan area
Miami Dolphins players
Chicago Rush players
New England Patriots players
Baltimore Ravens players
Jacksonville Jaguars players
New Orleans Saints players
Detroit Lions players